Zygaena lavandulae is a species of moth in the family Zygaenidae.

Subspecies
Subspecies include:
Zygaena lavandulae lavandulae
Zygaena lavandulae alfacarica Tremewan, 1961
Zygaena lavandulae barcelonica Reiss, 1936
Zygaena lavandulae consobrina Germar, 1836
Zygaena lavandulae espunnensis Reiss, 1922
Zygaena lavandulae micheaellae Rungs & Le Charles, 1943

Distribution

This species can be found in Southern France, eastern Spain, Portugal and Italy (only in central and western Liguria), as well as North Africa, including Morocco.

Description
The head is black. The thorax is black with a white collar. Also the abdomen is black, with a slight blue gloss. Forewings are bluish, with five red spots surrounded with black or dark blue. Hindwings are bluish-black with a very large distal red spot. Colorations of the females are rather similar to males, but their forewings are usually bluish-green, with larger spots.

Habitat
These moths mainly inhabit rocky places, dry woods and grove rich grasslands. They are present in the Maquis shrubland, characterized by the widespread presence of Cistus species.

Biology
There is one generation per year (univoltine). The larvae feed on Dorycnium pentaphyllum and Anthyllis cytisoides. They develop until April without real dormancy. Adults are on wing from April to June.

References

Moths described in 1783
Zygaena
Moths of Europe
Moths of Africa
Taxa named by Eugenius Johann Christoph Esper